Sikanderpur may refer to:

 Sikanderpur, Punjab, in India
 Sikanderpur, Uttar Pradesh in Ballia district, India
 Sikanderpur, Kannauj in Kannauj district of Uttar Pradesh, India
 Sikandarpur, Haripur District, Pakistan
 Sikanderpur metro station, Gurgaon, India
 Sikandarpur, Tadiyawan, a village in Uttar Pradesh, India